Seon Mac Solaidh, aka Sean or John Mac Solly, Irish poet and scribe, fl. 1720s.

Biography

A native of Harmanstown, parish of Stackallen, County Meath, Paul Walsh described him as follows: "He cultivated Irish literature, not, however, as an original author. He is known as a diligent copier of MSS., and as a friend of Tadhg O Neachtain, the lexico-grapher ...  The two men were joint scribes of a MS. which Edward O Reilly was in possession of in 1830." In a poem of c. 1726, Ó Neachtain refers to Mac Solaidh as follows:

Mac Solaidh was the scribe of the first part of Stair Eamonn Ui Clerigh (the story of Eamonn Ó Clerigh), composed by Ó Neachtain. He was the scribe of copies of Geoffrey Keating's Foras Feasa ar Éirinn, the Spiritual Mirror on the Beginning and End of Human Life (compiled by Thomas Mac Gabhrain), "and that his signature is found in the printed copy of Mac Aingil's Mirror of the Sacrament of Penance in the Library of Maynooth ... Though his handwriting is not elegant he copied accurately enough, considering the opportunities he had, and the times in which he lived."

A letter of 1718

See also

 Richard Tipper
 Seamus Ó Fearghail
 Proinsias Ó Doibhlin
 Gearóid Mac Con Mhíde

External links
 Gleaning from Irish manuscripts, National Library of Scotland
 

Irish scribes
Irish-language poets
18th-century Irish poets
People from County Meath
Irish scholars and academics